Ashleigh Hewson (born 18 December 1979) is a female rugby union player that plays for . She has been a member of the Wallaroos squad to three World Cups, the 2010 Women's Rugby World Cup that finished in third place, the 2014 Women's Rugby World Cup that finished in 7th where Hewson was the 5th highest points scorer of the competition scoring 39 points, and the 2017 Women's Rugby World Cup where she led Australia as the captain.

Hewson was a prison guard in Sydney for 10 years and now works as a Services and Program officer with offenders who have an intellectual disability.

In October 2016, Hewson was named as Australia's women's XVs player of the year. Hewson captained the Wallaroos in her 3rd World Cup in 2017

References

External links
Wallaroos Profile

1979 births
Living people
Australia women's international rugby union players
Australian female rugby union players
Rugby union fly-halves
Rugby union fullbacks
Sportswomen from New South Wales
Rugby union players from Sydney